Yamashita Station is the name of multiple railway stations in Japan.

 Yamashita Station (Hyogo) - (山下駅) in Hyogo Prefecture
 Yamashita Station (Miyagi) - (山下駅) in Miyagi Prefecture
 Yamashita Station (Tokyo) - (山下駅) in Tokyo